Alois Rigert (born 18 July 1906, date of death unknown) was a Swiss weightlifter. He competed in the men's featherweight event at the 1936 Summer Olympics.

References

1906 births
Year of death missing
Swiss male weightlifters
Olympic weightlifters of Switzerland
Weightlifters at the 1936 Summer Olympics
Place of birth missing